Giovanni "Nanni" Baldini (born 13 August 1975) is an Italian voice actor.

Biography
Baldini often contributes to voicing characters in cartoons, anime, movies, and other content. For example, he is well known for providing the voice of the character Stewie Griffin in the Italian-language version of the animated sitcom Family Guy. He is also well known for providing the voice of the character Donkey in the Italian-language version of the Shrek film series as well as voicing various characters in the Italian dub of the Robot Chicken segments.

In his live-action roles, Baldini served as the Italian voice of Jack McFarland from Will & Grace, Pacey Witter from Dawson's Creek, Christopher Duncan Turk from Scrubs and the Eleventh Doctor from Doctor Who. He dubs actors such as Kevin Hart, Adam Goldberg, Chris Rock, Topher Grace, Chris Tucker, Anthony Mackie and Michael Peña.

He works at C.D. Cine Dubbing, LaBibi.it, Dubbing Brothers, Pumaisdue, and other dubbing studios in Italy. His older siblings are also voice actors.

Dubbing roles

Animation
 Stewie Griffin in Family Guy
 Donkey in Shrek
 Donkey in Shrek 2
 Donkey in Shrek the Third
 Donkey in Shrek Forever After
 Donkey in Shrek the Halls
 Donkey in Scared Shrekless
 Various characters in Robot Chicken
 Scooby-Doo in Shaggy & Scooby-Doo Get a Clue!
 Jeff Fischer in American Dad!
 Stan Marsh in South Park (First dub)
 Stan Marsh in South Park: Bigger, Longer & Uncut
 Katsuhiko Jinnai in El-Hazard
 Flappy Bob in School's Out! The Musical
 Rango in Rango
 Furuki in Hungry Heart: Wild Striker
 Remy in Ratatouille
 Wormmon in Digimon Adventure 02
 Mr. Match and WackoMan in MegaMan NT Warrior
 Reginald "Skull" Skulinski in Monster House
 Hobie in Barbie as Rapunzel
 Naoyuki Saruta in Paranoia Agent
 Michelangelo in TMNT
 Ace in World of Winx
 Minion in Megamind
 Tatsuma Sakamoto in Gin Tama
 Denahai in Brother Bear
 Bobby Zimuruski in A Goofy Movie
 Bobby Zimuruski in An Extremely Goofy Movie
 Toru Watanabe in Excel Saga
 Mikey in Pig City
 Slurms MacKenzie in Futurama
 Tiny in Harvey Girls Forever!
 Nelson Muntz (4th voice) / Snake Jailbird (4th voice) in The Simpsons
 Dick Dastardly in Wacky Races
 Franz in Princess Sissi
 Jorg in Strange Dawn
 Teppei Kisugi in Captain Tsubasa
 Cube in Petite Princess Yucie
 Carl the Evil Cockroach Wizard in Yin Yang Yo!
 Manten in InuYasha
 David Kawena in Lilo & Stitch
 David Kawena in Stitch! The Movie
 David Kawena in Lilo & Stitch 2: Stitch Has a Glitch
 David Kawena in Lilo & Stitch: The Series
 Icarus in Hercules: The Animated Series
 Shunsuke Akagi in Dai-Guard
 Sterling Überbucks in Roboroach
 Teru Mikami in Death Note
 Ian Wazselewski in Teacher's Pet
 Dr. Nefario in Despicable Me
 Dr. Nefario in Despicable Me 2
 Twitchy Squirrel in Hoodwinked!
 15 Cent in The Proud Family Movie
 Sid Phillips in Toy Story 3
 Bunny in Toy Story 4
 Needleman in Monsters, Inc.
 Oh in Home
 Mooseblood in Bee Movie
 Blake in Bolt
 Benny in The Lego Movie
 Benny in The Lego Movie 2: The Second Part
 Dr. Jagu in Space Chimps
 Reggie in Free Birds
 Mole in The Nut Job
 Mole in The Nut Job 2: Nutty by Nature
 Cheezi in The Lion Guard
 Mungo in Tarzan
 Carl in Meet the Robinsons
 Agustín Madrigal in Encanto
 Cooper in Trolls
 Cal Weathers in Cars 3
 Ned / Zed in Planes
 Angus MacDougall in Cats & Dogs: The Revenge of Kitty Galore
 Deuce in The Day My Butt Went Psycho!
 Eugene Fitzherbert in Tangled: Before Ever After
 Eugene Fitzherbert in Rapunzel's Tangled Adventure
 Big Bird in The Adventures of Elmo in Grouchland
 Francie in ChalkZone

Live action
 Jack McFarland in Will & Grace
 Christopher Duncan Turk in Scrubs
 Eleventh Doctor in Doctor Who
 Pacey Witter in Dawson's Creek
 Ephram Brown in Everwood
 Michael G. Vickers in Charlie Wilson's War
 Chuck Bartowski in Chuck
 BiggBunny Deenz in Fool's Gold
 Dante Slate Jr. in Grudge Match
 Ben Barber in Ride Along
 Ben Barber in Ride Along 2
 Bernie in About Last Night
 Darnell Lewis in Get Hard
 Jimmy Callahan in The Wedding Ringer
 Calvin Joyner in Central Intelligence
 Franklin "Mouse" Finbar in Jumanji: Welcome to the Jungle
 Franklin "Mouse" Finbar in Jumanji: The Next Level
 Teddy Walker in Night School
 Lee Butters in Lethal Weapon 4
 Wesley in Nurse Betty
 Lance Barton in Down to Earth
 Mays Gilliam in Head of State
 Richard Cooper in I Think I Love My Wife
 Vic Mac in What to Expect When You're Expecting
 Seth Abrahams in Traffic
 Pete Monash in Win a Date with Tad Hamilton!
 Carter Duryea in In Good Company
 F. Scott Feinstadt in P.S.
 Jason Morris in Valentine's Day
 Edwin in Predators
 Jared Griffin The Big Wedding
 Mike Smith in Truth
 Sam Wilson / Falcon in Captain America: The Winter Soldier
 Sam Wilson / Falcon in Avengers: Age of Ultron
 Sam Wilson / Falcon in Ant-Man
 Sam Wilson / Falcon in Captain America: Civil War
 Sam Wilson / Falcon in Avengers: Infinity War
 Sam Wilson / Falcon in Avengers: Endgame
Percy Williams in Love the Coopers
 Micah in Io
 James Carter in Rush Hour
 James Carter in Rush Hour 2
 James Carter in Rush Hour 3
 Ruby Rhod in The Fifth Element
 Danny McDaniels in Silver Linings Playbook
 Tom Paris (2nd voice) in Star Trek: Voyager
 Clark Kent (teenager) in Superman (2003 redub)
 Scooby-Doo in Scooby-Doo
 Scooby-Doo in Scooby-Doo 2: Monsters Unleashed
 Balthasar Montague in William Shakespeare's Romeo + Juliet
 Andy Walker in Look Both Ways
 Tinky Winky in Teletubbies
 Riley Finn, Jesse, Chris Epps, and other characters in Buffy the Vampire Slayer
 Danny Donald in Evolution
 Cody Anthony Miller in Student Bodies
 Fabrizio De Rossi in Titanic
 Dode in Brick
 Randy Daytona in Balls of Fury
 Sam in Coffee Town
 Richard in Crazy, Stupid, Love
 Edwin in Predators
 Derek Huff in Step Brothers
 Roy Trenneman in The IT Crowd
 Itsuki Tachibana in Initial D
 Art in My Life in Film
 Richard "Ricky C" Cunningham in Ali G Indahouse

References

External links
 
 
 

1975 births
Living people
Male actors from Rome
Italian male voice actors
Italian male video game actors
20th-century Italian male actors
21st-century Italian male actors